Cimbrophlebia is an extinct genus of Mecoptera which existed from the Jurassic to the Eocene period.

Species
The genus Cimbrophlebia contains the species:
Cimbrophlebia amoena Daohugou, China, Callovian
Cimbrophlebia bittaciformis Fur Formation, Denmark, Eocene
Cimbrophlebia brooksi Klondike Mountain Formation, Washington, Eocene
Cimbrophlebia flabelliformis Kamloops Group, Canada, Ypresian
Cimbrophlebia leahyi Kamloops Group, Canada, Ypresian
Cimbrophlebia rara Yixian Formation, China, Aptian
Cimbrophlebia westae Klondike Mountain Formation, Washington, Eocene

References

Mecoptera
Eocene insects
Fossil taxa described in 1977
Prehistoric insects of Europe
Cenozoic insects of Asia
Prehistoric insect genera
Fur Formation
Tranquille Formation
Klondike Mountain Formation